Salumbar is a District in the Indian state of Rajasthan.

Geography
It has an average elevation of 262 metres (859 feet).

Demographics
 India census, Salumbar had a population of 248,337 of which 125,974 are males while 122,363 are females. The Female Sex Ratio in Salumbar Municipality stood as 951, against the state average of 928. Salumbar city had a Literacy rate of 85.82%, which was higher than the state average of 66.11%. Male literacy was 93.78%, and female literacy was 77.56%. There are around 3,392 houses under the Salumbar Municipality administration, where it supplies basic amenities like water and sewerage.

Earlier in 2001,  India census, Salumber had a population of 15,862. Males constitute 51% of the population and females 49%. Salumbar has an average literacy rate of 76%, higher than the national average of 59.5%: male literacy is 83%, and female literacy is 68%. In Salumbar, 13% of the population is under 6 years of age.

References

Cities and towns in Udaipur district